Matvei Yevgenyevich Safonov (born 25 February 1999) is a Russian professional footballer who plays as a goalkeeper for Krasnodar and the Russia national team.

Club career
He made his debut in the Russian Premier League for FC Krasnodar on 13 August 2017 in a game against FC Amkar Perm.

International career
On 9 October 2020, he was called up to Russia national football team for the first time for UEFA Nations League games against Turkey and Hungary.

On 11 May 2021, he was included in the preliminary extended 30-man squad for UEFA Euro 2020. He made his debut on 1 June in a friendly against Poland. On 2 June, he was included in the final squad. On 16 June, he played in Russia's second group game against Finland, keeping a clean sheet in a 1–0 victory. He played again on 21 June in the last group game against Denmark, allowing 4 goals in a 1–4 loss, as Russia was eliminated.

Career statistics

Club

International

References

External links
 

1999 births
Sportspeople from Stavropol
Living people
Russian footballers
Russia youth international footballers
Russia under-21 international footballers
Russia international footballers
Association football goalkeepers
FC Krasnodar-2 players
FC Krasnodar players
Russian Premier League players
Russian First League players
Russian Second League players
UEFA Euro 2020 players